Anolis tropidolepis, the swift anole, is a species of lizard in the family Dactyloidae. The species is found in Costa Rica.

References

Anoles
Endemic fauna of Costa Rica
Reptiles of Costa Rica
Reptiles described in 1885
Taxa named by George Albert Boulenger